Bajega Band Baaja is an Indian comedy television series starring Swapnil Joshi and Ami Trivedi in lead roles. The show aired on DD National from 2009 to 2010.

Plot

Sameer (Swapnil Joshi) comes from USA to meet his dying father who leaves behind a will saying that Sameer has to marry an Indian girl within 1 year or else he'll lose the entire fortune.

Cast

Details
Sound Recordist       = Sachin Jadhav
Art Director          = Dinesh Shinde
Cameraman             = Shiva Ambli
Screenplay & Dialogue = Ashok Patole
Background Music      = Firoz Patel
Editor                = Deepak Jaul
Lyrics                = Nawab Aarzoo
Title track Singer    = Vinod Rathod
Music                 = Lalit Sen
Executive Producers   = Chirag Shah, Naresh Narula and Beena Seth
Head of Production    = Abhay R. Singh
Producers             = Hasmukh Shah and Naveeta Kessar
Story                 = Sundeep Dara
Direction             = Sundeep Dara

References

External links 
 

Indian comedy television series